Muhammad Asghar Khan Nawani was a Pakistani policeman-turned-politician who belonged to Shahani Baloch tribe of Punjab. From 1997 to 1999, he was an elected Member of the National Assembly (MNA) of Pakistan from NA-73, Bhakkar. He was renowned for his public services not only in his district but also nationwide. He was a brilliant cop (often called Halaku Khan for his bravery), an intellectual, a very wise politician and a king maker in his abilities.

Starting his career from primary level as Assistant Sub-Inspector in Punjab Police, it's really astonishing how he reached to the key positions and going all the way, he last served in Police department as a DIG the second highest provincial level after the Inspector General (IG). He also served in PIA (Pakistan International Airlines).

He was given the title "Halaku khan" due to his dictatorship style. It is said that no one was willing to hang former Prime Minister of Pakistan Zulfiqar Ali Bhutto but Asghar khan did.

Film named Jagga Tax  released in 2002 depicts the character of Police Officer based on Khan Asghar Khan aka Halaku Khan (DIG Punjab) (Ex-MNA) which shows his strict and strong attitude towards the criminals.

References

Year of birth missing (living people)
Pakistani police officers
Baloch people
Living people
Pakistani MNAs 1997–1999